Ethnikos Piraeus Water Polo Club is the water polo team of Ethnikos OFPF (meaning: National Club of Fans of Piraeus and Phalerum, in Greek: Εθνικός Όμιλος Φιλάθλων Πειραιώς Φαλήρου).  

Ethnikos is one of the most successful and traditional water polo clubs in Greece. They have won a record 38 Greek water polo championships and 12 Greek water polo cups (eight of them are consecutive, which is a record) with 9 Doubles. Ethnikos has the record of 9 unbeaten doubles as well as the record for consecutive unbeaten doubles with 8. They hold the unique record of winning 18 championships in a row (from 1953 to 1970) and the second most with 14 in a row (from 1972 to 1985). Ethnikos holds the unique record for the most unbeaten championships with 29 (from which 11 are consecutive, which is also a record) and the record for consecutive years staying unbeaten in a match (13 years, from 1951 to 1964). Also, the club holds the record for most championships won exclusively with wins (19, 10 of which are consecutive, also a record).  

The dominance of Ethnikos along with his longstanding records led to his given nickname, the “Emperor”.   

The men's team was the first Greek club to reach the eight (1966) and four (1980) best teams in Europe. The team has been in the top-8 teams in Europe another eight times (1970, 1972, 1977, 1978, 1979, 1981, 1983, 1995).   

The women's team won the LEN Trophy in 2010 and repeated its triumph in 2022 to become the Greek team with the most LEN Trophies.  

Many great players have played for Ethnikos throughout the years. The Greece men's national water polo team for many years consisted of Ethnikos players that have participated in the Olympics. The greatest personality in the history of the club is Andreas Garifallos, player, coach and president. In the Kastella neighborhood of Piraeus, the swimming pool bears his name in honour of his contribution to Piraeus and Greece water polo. Other great players that have played for Ethnikos are Ioannis Garifallos, Giannis Karalogos, Thomas Karalogos,  Nondas Samartzidis, Kyriakos Iosifidis, Markellos Sitarenios, Sotirios Stathakis, Evangelos Patras, Konstantinos Kokkinakis, Filippos Kaiafas, Theodoros Kalakonas, Dimitrios Mazis, Christos Afroudakis, Antonios Aronis,, Dimitrios Konstas, Dimitrios Kougevetopoulos, Antonios Vlontakis, Gerasimos Voltirakis, Anastasios Schizas, Chris Humbert, Wolf Wigo, Ashleigh Johnson, Iefke van Belkum, Stephania Haralabidis, Ioanna Haralabidis, Maria Tsouri, Aikaterini Oikonomopoulou, Sofia Iosifidou, Marina Canetti

Men's team

Summary 
Ethnikos dominated in Greek Water Polo championship for many years. Since 1957, it has won the most Greek championships. It has won 38 championships and 12 cups. During last years its power has been limited, and it has been relegated to the second division (A2 Ethniki) twice. Out of the 91 seasons from 1928 until now, Ethnikos has 88 appearances. The team has three absences in 1935, 2010 and 2013. In 1980, Ethnikos became the first Greek team to reach the Final-4 of LEN Champions League (the elite European club competition). Besides that, Ethnikos has reached the final-8 nine times. In 2003 the team took the third place in LEN Trophy (second tier European club competition). The club has an eternal rivalry with Olympiacos, the other club from Piraeus. The match between the two is dubbed as the “Piraeus derby”. Ethnikos had won six consecutive Greek cups (four of them against Olympiacos in the final) before the competition had a hiatus of 25 years that stopped Ethnikos from winning many more trophies and achieving more doubles. Ethnikos lost ten games to Olympiacos in 41 years. Olympiacos surpassed Ethnikos in head-to-head wins in 2015. Another big rival of Ethnikos in the 30s, 40s, 50s and 60s was NO Patras.

1925–1940 (Pre WWII years) 
Ethnikos water polo team was founded shortly after the foundation of parent club Ethnikos OFPF which was founded in 1923. The team won its first Greek championship in 1926 without defeat in four games. In 1927 and 1929 the team finished second to Olympiacos and Aris respectively while the team finished third in 1928. In 1931, the team managed to dethrone Aris who had a three-peat of titles at the time and was the strongest in the country. In the next few years the team couldn't win another title despite reaching the final. In 1933 and 1934, Olympiacos won the championship in the final game against Ethnikos. Then, another team from Western Greece came into prospect, NC Patras. NC Patras won five championships in six years just before the start of WWII (1935-1940). Ethnikos was second in 1937 and third in 1938.

1945–1952 (First post WWII years) 
After WWII, Ethnikos had a good team but it was not enough in order to win the championship and so NC Patras and city rivals Olympiacos fought for the title. Exception was the year 1948 when Ethnikos won its third unbeaten championship with Andreas Garyfallos, an emerging young talent who was 17 at the time. In 1949, Ethnikos was unlucky because Garyfallos was injured. In 1951 Ethnikos loses to Olympiacos (2-1). However he would change the fate of the team for the next decades. Ethnikos came close to winning the championship in 1952 but the tie against NC Patras was crucial as Ethnikos had one point less Olympiacos in the standings.

1953–1985 (Domestic Dynasty) 
In 1953, Ethnikos managed to win the title once again unbeaten but also the team won the first edition of the Greek Cup. The Greek cup is the second most important competition in Greece. Ethnikos had a legendary team that won eleven consecutive unbeaten championships (1953-1963) as well as six Greek cups in a row (1953-1958). In 1959, the Greek cup was not contested and the competition was inactive until 1984. Olympiacos was the team that finally beat Ethnikos in 1964 (5-4) and it was Ethnikos's first loss to any club since 1951. However Ethnikos won again the championship by beating Olympiacos in the final match of the second round of the season (4-3), as well as beating the reds in a one match playoff (2-1). Olympiacos beat Ethnikos (7-6) in 1968 but Ethnikos beat Olympiacos 7-5 to get the title on goal difference. In 1969, the great Andreas Garyfallos retires. He was the face of Ethnikos for more than twenty years. He was by far the best player in Greece and he's still one of the biggest in the history of Greek water polo. He was close to being transferred to Pro Recco but he never played for any other team in his career. In 1969 the match between the two rivals ends as a tie and the clubs shared the title as no final playoff match was held. In 1971, Olympiacos finally managed to dethrone Ethnikos for the first time since 1952. Ethnikos's streak of 18 championships had just ended. In 1972 and 1973, Olympiacos fights for the title and beats Ethnikos but the title at the end of each season went to the blue and white part of Piraeus. Ethnikos wins the 1970, 1974, 1975, 1976, and 1979 titles unbeaten leaving Olympiacos second each year. In 1978, Ethnikos was very close to losing the title but a last round win against Olympiacos kept him alive as he forced a playoff match. Ethnikos won the encounter and the title once again. Ethnikos lost an encounter to ANO Glyfada in the penultimate round of the 1980 season so the championship was not clinched without a loss. In 1986 Ethnikos loses the championship to ANOG and eventually the 14 year championship winning streak since 1972 had come to an end.

1986–present 
Ethnikos was never again the same team as before due to the start of ANOG dominance and the retirement of many of the Ethnikos players. ANOG wins four championships between 1986 to 1990. Ethnikos wins the double in 1988 which is the last one. Olympiacos in the 80s was an average team, so Ethnikos had no problem winning every match from 1980 to 1989. In 1991, Ethnikos wins the cup for the 10th time and in 1994, the team wins its 37th national championship in a penalty shootout against bitter rivals Olympiacos. In 1995, the team loses to Catalunya but beats Israeli's Maccabi Tel–Aviv and Slovenia's Kopar in order to reach the quarters of the European Cup for the ninth and last time till today, only to get knocked out by European champion, Ujpest. In 1996, the captain of the national team and Ethnikos, Nondas Samartzidis, the strongest and most physical water polo player in the history of Greek water polo gets drowned during holidays. That tragedy shocked Ethnikos and Greece. Even today, no one has forgotten him and a national team tournament is taking place in honour of him. The next couple of years were rough for Ethnikos but the team surprised everyone when they won the Greek cup in 2000 against Olympiacos in extra time as the ultimate underdogs. In 2003, the team reached the semis of LEN Eurocup but lost to Brescia who went on to win the trophy. In 2005, the team won the last Greek cup by beating Olympiacos in the semifinal of the final four and NC Patras in the final. In 2005, the team finished first in the regular season but lost the championship in the final game of the playoffs to Olympiacos. The last championship came in 2006 when in game 5 of the finals, Ethnikos won the title in extra time, just before the penalty shoot-out. Antonis Vlontakis, the main star of the team, dedicated the championship in memory of late player Nondas Samartzidis who had won Ethnikos's penultimate title in 1994, two years prior to his death. In 2009, the team got relegated for the first time in its history something that happened again in 2012. In 2015, 2016 and 2019, Ethnikos finished fourth, his best finish since relegation. In 2020, the team played in the final of the Greek cup after a hiatus since 2007, but lost to Olympiacos.

Seasons

Honours 
 Greek Water Polo Championship
Winners (38) (record): 1926, 1931, 1948, 1953, 1954, 1955, 1956, 1957, 1958, 1959, 1960, 1961, 1962, 1963, 1964, 1965, 1966, 1967, 1968, 1969, 1970, 1972, 1973, 1974, 1975, 1976, 1977, 1978, 1979, 1980, 1981, 1982, 1983, 1984, 1985, 1988, 1994, 2006
In bold, the years when Ethnikos won the title unbeaten, in bold and italics, when the team won the title exclusively with wins.
 Greek Water Polo Cup
Winners (12): 1953, 1954, 1955, 1956, 1957, 1958, 1984, 1985, 1988, 1991, 2000, 2005
 Attica Water Polo Championship
Winners (11): 1952, 1953, 1954, 1955, 1956, 1957, 1959, 1960, 1961, 1962, 1963
  LEN Champions League
Fourth place: 1980
Quarterfinals: 1966, 1970, 1972, 1977, 1978, 1979, 1981, 1983, 1995

 Doubles (all of them unbeaten)
(9): 1953, 1954, 1955, 1956, 1957, 1958, 1984, 1985, 1988

Tom Hoad Cup 
Ethnikos Piraeus took part in the Tom Hoad Cup at the Melville Water Polo Club, Fremantle, Australia. There were six teams competing from around the world: the Fremantle Mariners (Australia), Ethnikos Piraeus (Greece), Galatasaray Water Polo Team (Turkey), Japan National Water Polo Team, The Barbarians and a composite European team including three Hungarian Olympic gold medalists. The competition took place from the 27th-30 December 2008, with gold going to The Barbarians.

Notable players

Notable coaches

Women's team
The women's team of Ethnikos has won 3 championships and 2 European cups (LEN Trophy). The current season (2022-23) is competing in the first division championship (A1 Ethniki). The team has competed in every season of the Greek League since it was established in 1989 (35 appearances).

Honours
  Women's LEN Trophy
Winners (2): 2010, 2022
 Greek Championships
Winners (3): 1988, 1990, 1992
 LEN Supercup
Finalist (2): 2010, 2022

Notable players

Notable coaches
 Koen Plasmeijer

References

External links
Official Website

Water polo clubs in Greece
 
Ethnikos Piraeus